Feng Lixiang (born August 1957) is a Chinese politician from Shanxi who served as the Communist Party Secretary of Datong from 2008 to 2014. In 2014, he was investigated for corruption, expelled from the Communist Party, and indicted on bribery charges.

Early life and education
Feng was born and raised in Shanyin County, Shanxi. In December 1974, at age 17, he became a sent-down youth during the Cultural Revolution. Feng joined the Chinese Communist Party in September 1976, around the time of Mao's death. 

After the resumption of National College Entrance Examination, he entered the Taiyuan University of Technology, majoring in mechanical engineering. After college, he was assigned to Shanxi Metallurgical Geological Exploration Company, one year later, he was transferred to the General Office of CPC Shanxi Provincial Committee as a secretary. He earned a M.E. degree from University of Science and Technology Beijing in 1995 and a Doctor of Management Science and Engineering degree from Nanjing University of Aeronautics and Astronautics in 2008.

Career
From December 1988 to March 1996, he served in various political roles in the General Office of the Shanxi Provincial Government. He served as secretary general of Taiyuan Municipal Party Committee from March 1996 to August 2001, then he was promoted to deputy party chief of Taiyuan.

Feng served as deputy party chief of Datong from February 2006 to February 2008, and the party chief, the top political position in the city, from February 2008 to October 2014. He concurrently served as mayor of Datong from March 2006 to February 2008.

Downfall
On October 15, 2014, it was announced that Feng was being investigated by the Central Commission for Discipline Inspection of the Chinese Communist Party for "serious violations of laws and regulations". Feng was the first prefecture-level "first-in-charge" (i.e. party chief) to be investigated for corruption in Shanxi province after the 18th Party Congress.  Following his dismissal, several of his subordinates, including the party chiefs of the Yanggao, Tianzhen and Zuoyun counties, were rounded up for investigation as well, showing the 'depth' of corruption in the city. In November 2014, Feng was indicted on charges of giving and accepting bribes by the Tianjin People's Procuratorate, and arrested. 

After his dismissal, Datong did not have a party chief until August 2015, when Beijing official Zhang Jifu was 'parachuted' into the city to take charge. On August 7, he was expelled from the Chinese Communist Party (CCP) and dismissed from public office. And his suspected crimes will be transferred to the procuratorate for further investigation and prosecution. 

On October 12, 2016, he was sentenced to 20 years and fined 2 million yuan for taking bribes, offering bribes and huge amount of property with unknown sources.

References

1957 births
Chinese Communist Party politicians from Shanxi
Living people
Political office-holders in Shanxi
Taiyuan University of Technology alumni
University of Science and Technology Beijing alumni
Nanjing University of Aeronautics and Astronautics alumni
People's Republic of China politicians from Shanxi
Mayors of places in China
Politicians from Shuozhou
Expelled members of the Chinese Communist Party